Heladio Gerardo Verver y Vargas Ramírez (born 9 November 1958) is a Mexican politician from the Institutional Revolutionary Party. From 2009 to 2012 he served as Deputy of the LXI Legislature of the Mexican Congress representing Zacatecas.

References

1958 births
Living people
Politicians from Zacatecas
21st-century Mexican politicians
Deputies of the LXI Legislature of Mexico
Members of the Chamber of Deputies (Mexico) for Zacatecas